is a district (huyện) in Quảng Nam province, Vietnam. During the Vietnam War, it was the site of heavy fighting, including Operation Unions I and II. From 1962 to 1967, the southern side of the valley was part of Quảng Tín province.

As of 2003, the district had a population of 129,190. The district covers an area of 707 km². The district capital lies at Đông Phú.

References

Districts of Quảng Nam province
Battlefields in Vietnam